Roloff Beny  (1924–1984) was a Canadian photographer who spent the better part of his life in Rome and on his photographic travels throughout the world. Born Wilfred Roy Beny in Medicine Hat, Alberta, he later took as his first name Roloff, his mother's maiden name.

Life
Beny was born in Medicine Hat, Alberta on January 7, 1924.

Beny studied at the University of Toronto and took art classes at the Banff Centre for the Arts and the University of Iowa. At Iowa, he studied with master printmaker Mauricio Lasansky, who gave him one of his prints. Beny began photographing in the 1950s simply as a way to capture scenes for his paintings before growing more interested in the medium.<ref name=nyt>"Roloff Beny Is Dead at 60; Painter and Photographer." The New York Times, published: March 17, 1984  | | Archived via the TimesMachine, Retrieved 13 January 2023.</ref>

He maintained a photographic studio in Lethbridge, Alberta throughout his life and used the studio while visiting his relatives.

Development of fame
Beny had a considerable reputation and exhibition record as the maker of progressive painting, drawing and printmaking in the late 1940s and early 1950s. He was recognized as one of the leading abstract artists of his day with works of the period exhibited and collected at that time by the Metropolitan Museum of Art, the Museum of Modern Art, the Art Gallery of Ontario, and the National Gallery of Canada, among others. His work in painting, drawing and prints is discussed in Roloff Beny Visual Journeys. 

His book To Every Thing There is a Season was presented to visiting heads of state during Canada's 1967 centennial celebration. In 1968 his book India was chosen by the Indian Government to celebrate the centenary of Gandhi's birth.

Canada, as Beny remarked, had "no temples two thousand years old, no paths worn hard by passionate travelers." But the photographer soon found his way to those paths and temples in the course of "insatiable wanderings in Europe and Asia," and, above all, around the perimeter of the Mediterranean. Beny was in early days a protégé of Peggy Guggenheim and Herbert Read. The circle of friends around him—actors, artists, collectors, writers—included Laurence Olivier, Stephen Spender, Rose Macaulay, Bernard Berenson, Jean Cocteau, Henry Moore, and other makers of art and literature. His books have been published in America, Canada, England, France, Germany, Italy, Spain, the Netherlands, Yugoslavia, Denmark, Sweden, Finland, Iran, and Japan.

Career in its peak; life's end
Beny was obsessed with the beauty of the world. He has been called "a poetic photographer" and he was a passionate aesthete.  His photographic journeys were recorded in a series of large-scale volumes which appeared over the years. Beny's work is in the collections of the Museum of Modern Art, the National Gallery of Canada, and the Yale University Art Gallery. "I see majestic ruins even in the architecture of the skies," he wrote in the Preface to his book, Pleasure of Ruins.

Roloff Beny died March 16, 1984, of a heart attack, aged 60, in his Roman studio overlooking the Tiber. His last four volumes appeared posthumously.

Beny donated his artwork including collections of Canadian and international art, together with his papers, to the University of Lethbridge Art Gallery.

Roloff Beny's books

1958 – The Thrones of Earth and Heaven, H.N. Abrams
1962 – A Time of Gods, Studio, 
1964 – Interprets in Photographs: Pleasure of Ruins, Holt, Rinehart and Winston, 
1967 – To Every Thing There is a Season, Roloff Beny in Canada, Thames and Hudson
1967 – Japan in Color, McGraw-Hill
1969 – India, Roloff Beny and Aubrey Menen, Thames & Hudson Ltd, 
1970 – Island Ceylon, Studio, 
1974 – Roloff Beny in Italy, McClelland and Stewart, 
1974 – Persia, Bridge of Turquoise, Roloff Beny, Seyyed Hossein Nasr and Mitchell Crites, New York Graphic Society, 
1978 – Iran, Elements of Destiny, Everest House, 
1981 – The Churches of Rome, Roloff Beny and Peter Gunn, Littlehampton Book Services Ltd, 
1981 – Odyssey: Mirror on the Mediterranean, Harpercollins, 
1983 – The Gods of Greece, Roloff Beny and Arianna Stassinopoulos, Harry N. Abrams
1984 – Rajasthan, Land of Kings, McClelland & Stewart,  (Beny died while this book was in publication.)
1985 – The Romance of Architecture, H.N. Abrams,  (posthumous)
1985 – Iceland, McClelland & Stewart,  (posthumous)
1994 – Visual Journeys, Roloff Beny, Mitchell Crites and Michael Crites, Thames & Hudson,  (posthumous)
1995 – People, Legends in Life and Art, Roloff Beny, Mitchell Crites and Jack McClelland, Thames & Hudson,  (posthumous)

Awards
His books won awards throughout a long career, beginning with The Thrones of Earth and Heaven in 1958.  To Every Thing There is a Season: Roloff Beny in Canada'' is a study of his native land. In 1972 he was made an Officer of the Order of Canada. He was a member of the Royal Canadian Academy of Arts.

References

External links
 Library and Archives Canada: Legends in Life and Art: The Portrait Photography of Roloff Beny
 Roloff Beny, Lethbridge College Buchanan Art Collection

1924 births
1984 deaths
Artists from Alberta
University of Toronto alumni
Trinity College (Canada) alumni
Members of the Royal Canadian Academy of Arts
Officers of the Order of Canada
People from Medicine Hat
Canadian expatriates in Italy